Pyncostola lacteata is a moth of the family Gelechiidae. It was described by Anthonie Johannes Theodorus Janse in 1950. It is found in Namibia.

References

Moths described in 1950
Pyncostola
Taxa named by Anthonie Johannes Theodorus Janse